The scientific name Muraena ophis is a synonym of either of two species of eel:
Muraena ophis Linnaeus, 1758 is now Ophichthus ophis (Linnaeus, 1758)
Muraena ophis Rüppell, 1830 is now Echidna nebulosa (Ahl, 1789)